The Chaturvimshatimurti is the representation of twenty-four aspects of the deity Vishnu in Hindu iconography. These aspects are described to represent the central tenets of the Pancharatra tradition. They are believed to be the most significant of the thousand names of the deity featured in the Vishnu Sahasranama. The names of these aspects of the deity are ritually chanted in daily prayer by adherents.

Literature 
The twenty-four forms of Vishnu seem to have been conceived in the Mahabharata. His forms are first mentioned in Agni Purana, the Rūpamaṇḍana, and the Aparājitapṛcchā. They are also mentioned in Vaishnava Puranas such as the Bhagavata Purana and the Vishnu Purana.

Usage 
 The achamanam is a ritual where these names are used while simultaneously touching the numerous parts of the body to purify them.
 The names form an important part of the Bhakti tradition, with saints such as Purandara Dasa having sung many devotional songs in their praise.

Iconography 

The chaturvimshatimurti are all represented as standing and holding the four attributes of Vishnu: the Sudarshana Chakra (discus), Panchajanya (conch), Kaumodaki (mace), and Padma (lotus). Symbolising the deity's different visible forms, the only difference between these images is the order of the emblems held by his four hands. All of the forms wear the kiritamukuta, the crown of Vishnu, and the traditional ornaments of the deity. They stand upon the base of a lotus (padmasana). According to Gopinatha Rao, the distribution of the four attributes among the four hands of each form are to be observed in a circular fashion, from the upper right hand to the upper left hand, and then from the lower left hand to the lower right hand.

See also 
 Vishnu Sahasranama
 Chaturvyuha
 Dashavatara

References

Hindu iconography

Forms of Vishnu